Edward James Corbett  (25 July 1875 – 19 April 1955) was a Indian-born British hunter, tracker, naturalist, and author who hunted a number of man-eating tigers and leopards in the Indian subcontinent.
He held the rank of colonel in the British Indian Army and was frequently called upon by the Government of the United Provinces of Agra and Oudh, now the Indian states of Uttar Pradesh and Uttarakhand, to kill man-eating tigers and leopards that were preying on people in the nearby villages of the Kumaon-Garhwal Regions.

He authored Man-Eaters of Kumaon, Jungle Lore, and other books recounting his hunts and experiences, which enjoyed critical acclaim and commercial success. He became an avid photographer and spoke out for the need to protect India's wildlife from extermination.

Early life

Edward James Corbett was born on 25 July 1875 of British ancestry in the town of Nainital in Kumaon division, Uttarakhand, India. He grew up in a large family of sixteen children and was the eighth child of Christopher William Corbett and his wife Mary Jane née Prussia who had previously married Dr. Charles James Doyle of Agra, who died at Etawah in 1857. Jim Corbett's parents had moved to Nainital in 1862 after his father had quit military service and been appointed the town's postmaster. In winters, the family used to move to the foothills, where they owned a cottage named "Arundel" in the village now known as Kaladhungi.
Corbett's mother was very influential in Nainital's social life among Europeans, and she became a kind of real estate agent for European settlers. His father retired from the position of postmaster in 1878 and died a few weeks after a heart attack on 21 April 1881. Jim was then aged six and his eldest brother Tom took over as postmaster of Nainital.

From a very early age, Jim was fascinated by the forests and the wildlife around his home in Kaladhungi. Through frequent excursions, he learned to identify most animals and birds by their calls. Over time, he became a good tracker and hunter. He studied at Oak Openings School, which merged with Philander Smith College, in Nainital, later known as the Halett War School, and now known as Birla Vidya Mandir, Nainital.

Before he was nineteen, he quit school and found employment with the Bengal and North Western Railway, initially working as a fuel inspector at Manakpur in Punjab, and subsequently as a contractor for the trans-shipment of goods across the Ganga at Mokama Ghat in Bihar. Jim Corbett started a school for railway staff at Mokama Ghat.

Hunting tigers and leopards

During his life, Corbett tracked and shot several leopards and tigers; about a dozen were well documented man-eaters. Corbett provided estimates of human casualties in his books, including Man-Eaters of Kumaon, The Man-Eating Leopard of Rudraprayag, and The Temple Tiger and More Man-Eaters of Kumaon.  Calculating the totals from these accounts, these big cats had killed more than 1,200 men, women, and children, according to Corbett. There are some discrepancies in the official human death tolls that the British and Indian governments have on record and Corbett's estimates.

The first designated man-eating tiger he killed, the Champawat Tiger, was responsible for an estimated 436 documented deaths. Though most of his kills were tigers, Corbett successfully killed at least two-man-eating leopards. The first was the Panar Leopard in 1910, which allegedly killed 400 people. The second was the man-eating Leopard of Rudraprayag in 1926, which terrorized the pilgrims journeying to the holy Hindu shrines Kedarnath and Badrinath for more than eight years, and was said to be responsible for more than 126 deaths.

Other notable man-eaters he killed were the Talla-Des man-eater, the Mohan man-eater, the Thak man-eater, the Muktesar man-eater and the Chowgarh tigress.

Analysis of carcasses, skulls, and preserved remains show that most of the man-eaters were suffering from disease or wounds, such as porcupine quills embedded deep in the skin or gunshot wounds that had not healed, like that of the Muktesar Man-Eater. The Thak man-eating tigress, when skinned by Corbett, revealed two old gunshot wounds; one in her shoulder had become septic, and could have been the reason for the tigress's having turned man-eater, Corbett suggested. In the foreword of Man Eaters of Kumaon, Corbett writes:
The wound that has caused a particular tiger to take to man-eating might be the result of a carelessly fired shot and failure to follow up and recover the wounded animal or be the result of the tiger having lost his temper while killing a porcupine

Corbett preferred to hunt alone and on foot when pursuing dangerous game. He often hunted with Robin, a small dog he wrote about in Man-Eaters of Kumaon.

Hunter and naturalist
Corbett bought his first camera in the late 1920s and—inspired by his friend Frederick Walter Champion—started to record tigers on cine film. Although he had an intimate knowledge of the jungle, it was a demanding task to obtain good pictures, as the animals were exceedingly shy.

A popular misconception is that Corbett never killed a tiger without confirmation of its killing people. For example, Corbett killed the unusually large and most widely sought after Bachelor of Powalgarh, even though this tiger had never killed a human.
Together with Champion, he played a key role in establishing India's first national park in the Kumaon Hills, the Hailey National Park, initially named after Lord Hailey. The park was renamed in Corbett's honour in 1957.

While dedicating his book My India  to "...my friends, the poor of India", he writes "It is of these people, who are admittedly poor, and who are often described as  'India's starving millions', among whom I have lived and whom I love, that I shall endeavour to tell in the pages of this book, which I humbly dedicate to my friends, the poor of India."  Profits from the publication of "Man-Eaters of Kumaon" were donated to St. Dunstan's, a training school for blinded veterans.

Jim Corbett resided in the Gurney House, Nainital along with his sister Maggie Corbett, where their mother moved in 1881 after the death of their father.  They sold the house to Mrs. Kalavati Varma, before leaving for Kenya in November 1947. The house is now a private residence, which has been transformed into a museum and is known as the Jim Corbett Museum.

Jim also spent a short time in Chotti Haldwani, a village he had adopted and which came to be known as Corbett's Village. Corbett and the villagers built a wall around the village in 1925 to keep wild animals out of the premises. As of 2018 the wall still stands, and according to villagers has prevented wild animal attacks on villagers since it was built.

Retirement in Kenya
After 1947, Corbett and his sister Maggie retired to Nyeri, Kenya, where he lived in the cottage 'Paxtu' in the grounds of the Hotel Outspan, which had originally been built for his friend Lord Baden-Powell.

He continued to write and sound the alarm about the declining numbers of wild cats and other wildlife. Corbett was at the Treetops, a hut built on the branches of a giant ficus tree, as the bodyguard of Princess Elizabeth when she stayed there on 5–6 February 1952. That night, her father, King George VI died, and Elizabeth ascended to the throne. Corbett wrote in the hotel's visitors' register:

For the first time in the history of the world, a young girl climbed into a tree one day a Princess, and after having what she described as her most thrilling experience, she climbed down from the tree the next day a Queen—God bless her.

Corbett died of a heart attack a few days after he finished his sixth book, Tree Tops, and was buried at St. Peter's Anglican Church in Nyeri. His memories were kept intact in the form of the meeting place Moti House, which Corbett had built for his friend Moti Singh, and the Corbett Wall, a long wall (approximately ) built around the village to protect crops from wild animals.

Man-eaters of Kumaon was a great success in India, the United Kingdom, and the United States, the first edition of the American Book-of-the-Month Club being 250,000 copies. It was later translated into 27 languages. Corbett's fourth book, Jungle Lore, is considered his autobiography.

The Jim Corbett National Park in Uttarakhand, India was renamed in his honour in 1957. He had played a key role in establishing this protected area in the 1930s.

In 1968, one of the five remaining subspecies of tigers was named after him: Panthera tigris corbetti, the Indochinese tiger, also called Corbett's tiger.

In 1994 and 2002, the long-neglected graves of Corbett and his sister (both in Kenya) were repaired and restored by Jerry A. Jaleel, founder and director of the Jim Corbett Foundation.

Personal life 
Corbett remained unmarried in life.

Hollywood movie
In 1948, in the wake of Man-Eaters of Kumaons success, a Hollywood film, Man-Eater of Kumaon, was made, directed by Byron Haskin and starring Sabu, Wendell Corey and Joe Page. The film did not follow any of Corbett's stories; a new story was invented. The film was a flop, although some interesting footage of the tiger was filmed. Corbett is known to have said that "the best actor was the tiger". 'Corbett Legacy' was produced by the Uttarakhand Forest Department and directed by Bedi Brothers which carried original footage shot by Corbett.

Other adaptations
In 1986, the BBC produced a docudrama titled Man-Eaters of India with Frederick Treves in the role of Jim Corbett. An IMAX movie India: Kingdom of the Tiger, based on Corbett's books, was made in 2002 starring Christopher Heyerdahl as Corbett. A TV movie based on The Man-Eating Leopard of Rudraprayag starring Jason Flemyng was made in 2005.

Honours
Corbett received the Kaisar-i-Hind Medal in the 1928 New Year Honours. He was made a Companion of the Order of the Indian Empire in the King's 1946 Birthday Honours.

Items named in honour of Jim Corbett's life and work
 A reserve area known as Hailey National Park covering  was created in 1936 when Sir Malcolm Hailey was the Governor of United Provinces; and Asia's first national park came into existence. The reserve was renamed in 1954–55 as Ramganga National Park and was again renamed in 1955–56 as Jim Corbett National Park.
 The Indochinese tiger was named after Jim Corbett in 1968 by Vratislav Mazak who was the first to describe the new subspecies of the tiger living in Southeast Asia
 Stephen Alter's In the Jungles of the Night: A Novel about Jim Corbett (2016) is a fictional account of Corbett's life.

Books
 Jungle Stories. Privately published in 1935 (only 100 copies)
 Man-Eaters of Kumaon. Oxford University Press, Bombay 1944
 The Man-eating Leopard of Rudraprayag. Oxford University Press, 1947
 My India. Oxford University Press, 1952
 Jungle Lore. Oxford University Press, 1953
 The Temple Tiger and More Man-eaters of Kumaon. Oxford University Press, 1954
 Tree Tops. Oxford University Press, 1955 (short 30-page novella)
 Jim Corbett's India – Selections by R. E. Hawkins. Oxford University Press, 1978
 My Kumaon: Uncollected Writings. Oxford University Press, 2012

See also
 Literary references to Nainital
 Kenneth Anderson, writer in South India
 Hunter-naturalists of India
 List of famous big game hunters
 Project Tiger

References

Further reading

External links

 My Kumaon: Uncollected Writings by Jim Corbett - Book Review
 "Jim Corbett International Research Group" website and FB discussion page
 The Corbett Foundation India
 Jim Corbett Tribute and Memorial website 
 Jim Corbett Tiger Reserve

 

1875 births
1955 deaths
British hunters
Companions of the Order of the Indian Empire
Hunters in British India
Naturalists of British India
British naturalists
People from Nainital
Indian conservationists
British conservationists
British people in colonial India
Recipients of the Kaisar-i-Hind Medal
British Indian Army officers